AbleLight, formerly known as Bethesda Lutheran Communities, is a non-profit human service organization serving people with intellectual and developmental disabilities through faith-based programs. Bethesda, a 501(c)3 non-profit, provides supports and services for more than 2,000 people with intellectual and developmental disabilities and their families in 11 states including California, Colorado, Illinois, Kansas, Michigan, Minnesota, Missouri, New Jersey, Oregon, Washington, and Wisconsin. The organization is headquartered in Watertown, Wisconsin.

History 

Bethesda was founded on April 13, 1904, in Watertown, Wisconsin, by Children’s Friends Societies from seven Midwestern states. The organization was originally named "The Society for the Training and Care of the Feeble-minded and Epileptic". The five people originally supported by the organization moved into rented quarters in Watertown.

In 1906, the organization had grown to serve 14 people, but lost its lease.  It relocated to a small vacant sanitarium in Milwaukee, Wisconsin, for 2½ years and grew to serve a clientele of 40 people. Having outgrown its Milwaukee location, the organization returned to Watertown in 1909, where the first permanent building was located on farmland along the banks of the Rock River. Above the main entrance to that building was placed a stone inscribed with a single word, “Bethesda”. The word is Hebrew for “House of Mercy” and is taken from a story of healing in the fifth chapter of the Gospel of John. The name of the organization was not officially changed to Bethesda Lutheran Home until 1924.

The original building quickly filled and others were built to accommodate a growing need for space. Through the first 40 years of its existence, Bethesda made use of the surrounding farmland and orchards to provide much of its own food. Many of the residents provided the necessary labor.

1970s
By the early 1970s, the number of people with intellectual and developmental disabilities living at the institution had grown to 660. In response to this large number of people, along with the growing level of individual needs, the board of directors and administration began to seek more appropriate living settings for many people. For others, they began to explore the possibility of establishing group homes away from Watertown and closer to people’s families.  In 1977, the first Bethesda group home was established in Maryville, Missouri. The establishment of additional homes in other states followed.

1980–2010
The 1980s and 1990s were marked by significant expansion of services in a number of states. In two locations, Kansas and Texas, Bethesda acquired existing programs that were facing financial difficulties.  Both programs are functioning and still expanding today. In Illinois, a number of new homes were constructed.

In the early 1980s, Bethesda established the National Christian Resource Center (NCRC). The NCRC provides outreach services beyond the individuals it supports. For 25 years, the NCRC produced religious education materials for churches; staff training materials for other service providers; referral information to parents, teachers and pastors; and scholarship and award programs for grade school, high school and college students. In 2009, the NCRC gave way to the Bethesda Institute, which has become the primary outreach division of Bethesda Lutheran Communities.  The Institute is planned to provide consultation, research, professional training, and leadership development in the field of intellectual and developmental disabilities.

In recognition of its broadened role in producing outreach materials and services beyond its single location in Watertown, Bethesda's Board of Directors made the decision in 1992 to change the name of the organization to Bethesda Lutheran Homes and Services, Inc. In 2004, Bethesda opened a new corporate headquarters building.

Good Shepherd Communities
In 2006, Bethesda became a nationwide organization when Good Shepherd Communities (GSC) became a wholly-controlled subsidiary of the organization. The histories of the two agencies had been intertwined since GSC’s inception. In 1949, Norma and Paul Yorde traveled from California to Watertown, Wisconsin, to inquire about placing their son on a waiting list for admission to Bethesda. Bethesda was unable to admit their son but offered the Yordes assistance in developing a program for people with disabilities on the west coast. 
  
The Good Shepherd Lutheran Home of the West was established in Terra Bella, California, with Bethesda providing assistance to help the organization get started and, in the 1970s, the two agencies partnered on a successful joint fundraising initiative.
 
In November 2008, Bethesda’s Board of Directors made the recommendation to formally merge with Good Shepherd Communities, effective September 1, 2009. That recommendation was preceded by a year-long study of Bethesda’s mission, vision, and values with relation to the strength of its identity. The merger of Bethesda and GSC was approved in May 2009, and on September 1, 2009, the single organization became known as Bethesda Lutheran Communities.

2020s 
In 2021, Raleigh, North Carolina-based Broadstep Behavioral Health, a portfolio company within the Double Impact fund of Bain Capital, acquired Bethesda Lutheran Communities' residential and support programs in Illinois, Indiana, and Wisconsin.

On January 10, 2022, Bethesda changed its name to AbleLight, in part to distinguish it from other organizations with Bethesda in their names.

Advocacy 
Through its Bethesda Voices program, an online community, Bethesda seeks to improve public policy affecting people with intellectual and developmental disabilities. Its purpose is to educate, engage and mobilize support for system reforms and improvements, and to seek improved and sustainable funding for services and supports. One focus is Medicaid reform, specifically, helping to make funding more accessible to people seeking services in the community as opposed to larger, institutional settings.

Programs 

, AbleLight supports individuals through hundreds of programs across 11 states including California, Colorado, Illinois, Kansas, Michigan, Minnesota, Missouri, New Jersey, Oregon, Wisconsin, and Washington. Most people served by AbleLight receive residential supports in group homes and apartments. AbleLight also provides vocational training either on its own or by contracting with other local providers.

Employment supports
AbleLight assists people with intellectual and developmental disabilities find career opportunities in Wisconsin, Oregon, and Colorado. Employment staff evaluate individuals and help them navigate the hiring process. AbleLight also works with employers who are looking for staff.

AbleLight College 
The AbleLight College of Applied Learning is a two-year post-secondary certificate program where students with intellectual and developmental disabilities can participate in college education. Students enrolled in AbleLight College live in integrated residence halls on the Concordia University Wisconsin campus in Mequon.

International work
On August 10, 2001, Bethesda joined with v. Bodelschwinghsche Anstalten Bethel of Germany, Nord-Norges Daikonistiftelse of Norway, Mosaic of the United States, and Bethphage of Great Britain to create IMPACT, an international organization formed to positively impact public policy throughout the world and to respond to the needs of children and adults with disabilities.

International partnerships also exist with the Lutheran Church–Missouri Synod World Relief and Human Care to provide special programs in Latvia, Romania, Russia, Kenya, and the Dominican Republic.

Camp Matz 

Bethesda previously operated Camp Matz, a fully accessible camp for people with disabilities, staffed by volunteers from the Lutheran Church–Missouri Synod’s Servant Event program. The camp was home to the only fully wheelchair accessible treehouse in the Midwest.

Chief executive officers 
 1975-1998: Alex Napolitano
 1998-2008: David Geske
 2008-2014: John Bauer
 2014–2021: Mike Thirtle
 2021-2022: Dave Sneddon (interim)
 2022-Present: Keith Jones

See also 
Lutheran Services in America
American Association on Intellectual and Developmental Disabilities

References

Further reading 
 Herzog, Albert. Disability Advocacy Among Religious Organizations: Histories and Reflections. Binghamton, New York: Haworth Press, 2006.

External links 
 
 v. Bodelschwinghsche Anstalten Bethel website
 History of Bethesda Lutheran Communities

Organizations based in Wisconsin
Organizations established in 1904